Latvian Football Cup 2001 was the fifty-ninth season of the Latvian annual football knock-out competition.

Preliminary round

| colspan="3" style="background:#9cc;"|April 7, 2001

|}

First round

| colspan="3" style="background:#9cc;"|April 10, 2001

|}

Quarterfinals

| colspan="3" style="background:#9cc;"|April 16, 2001

|-
| colspan="3" style="background:#9cc;"|April 22, 2001

|}

Semifinals

First legs were played on May 2 2001, second legs were played on May 10 2001.

 
 
|}

Final

External links
 Latvian Cup on rsssf.com

2001
2000–01 domestic association football cups
2001–02 domestic association football cups
Cup